Pantjiti Mary McLean (c. 1930, Kaltukatjara, Western Australia) is a Ngaatjajarra Aboriginal Australian artist.

Life 
Pantjiti Mary McLean was born circa 1930 in Kaltukatjara, Docker River, Western Australia. She met her husband Mr. Bates at Blackstone. In the 1950s she left the Western Desert walking with her husband and son to the Warburton Ranges, and then to Cosmo Newbury in the Eastern Goldfields. According to government policy of that time local Aboriginal children were to be raised and schooled by the missionaries at Mount Margaret Mission where McLean's son went too. When McLean's daughter was born, she was also taken away from her. While children were at the mission McLean was directed to work on the district sheep station where she chose to be a station hand mustering the sheep.

In the 1970s McLean moved to the Kalgoorlie Native Reserve, and then in the 1980s to the Ninga Mia Community in Kalgoorlie, where she lived until 2008. She now resides at a local aged care home in Kalgoorlie-Boulder.

Art 
During the 1980s McLean produced craftworks and traditional paintings. In 1992 she participated in the Warta Kutju (Wama Wanti) Street Art Project, where she met fibre artist Nalda Searles. Starting from 1992 McLean's paintings have been exhibited widely.

In 1993, she created her famous painting Hunting grounds depicting the ripe quandong fruit, the ripples on the surface of the waterholes, the scampering of the goanna and the laughter and song of her people. The same year a sell-out exhibition of her work in Fremantle launched her career. Throughout the 1990s she worked with artist Nalda Searles as part of the Healthway Fringe Camp Project and developed her distinctive painterly style. In 1995, McLean received a prestigious Telstra Indigenous Award.

In 2001, she was awarded an Honorary Doctorate of Letters from the Curtin University of Technology in Perth. In 2005 a book with a catalogue for a retrospective exhibition Pantjiti Mary McLean: A Big Story: Paintings and Drawings 1992–2005 was published in Adelaide. McLean's paintings are represented in all major public and many private collections around Australia.

Selected exhibitions 

 1992 Central Australian Aboriginal Art & Craft, Araluen Centre, Alice Springs NT
 1993 Hunting Grounds, Fremantle Arts Centre, Fremantle WA
 1993 Border Art workshops Indigenous Arts exhibition, San Diego USA
 1994 Bush Women, Fremantle Arts Centre, Perth, WA
 1994 Gallery of Aboriginal and South Pacific Art, Sydney NSW
 1995 12th National Aboriginal Art Award, MAGNT, Darwin NT
 1995 Pantjiti Mary McLean. Survey Exhibition, Australia House, London UK
 1995 Aboriginal & South Pacific Gallery, Sydney NSW
 1996 Telstra National Aboriginal Art Award, MAGNT, Darwin NT
 1996 Pantjti Mary McLean Recent Painting, Boomalli Aboriginal Artists Cooperative, Sydney NSW
 1996 Language of the Land, Goldfields Art Centre with Nalda Searles, Kalgoorlie WA
 1997 Telstra National Aboriginal Art Award, MAGNT, Darwin NT
 1997 Off Shore On Site, Festival of the Dreaming, Casula Powerhouse Arts, Sydney NSW
 1998 Pantjti Mary Mclean, Recent Paintings, Hogarth Gallery, Adelaide SA
 1998 Telstra National Aboriginal Art Award, MAGNT, Darwin NT
 1999 Go Along Now. Mustering Series, Fremantle Art Centre, Fremantle WA
 2000 Hogarth Gallery Sydney NSW2000 “Side by Side”, Art Gallery of Western Australia
 2000 Yuwayi Art Centre, Sydney NSW
 2000 Telstra Award Winners Exhibition, Customs House, Sydney NSW
 2001 Mary McLwean & Minnie Pwerle, Japingka Gallery, Fremantle WA
 2005 Pantjiti Mary McLean: A Big Story, Paintings and drawings 1992–2005, Tandanya National Aboriginal Cultural Institute Inc., Adelaide SA
 2014 Desert Song, Japingka Gallery, Fremantle WA

Collections 

 ArtBank 
 Art Gallery of Western Australia
 Art Gallery of New South Wales
 Australian Capital Equity
 Berndt Museum of Anthropology, University of Western Australia
 City of Fremantle
 City of Perth
 Cruthers Collection of Women's Art
 Edith Cowan University
 Holmes à Court Collection
 Museum & Art Gallery of the Northern Territory
 National Gallery of Australia, Canberra
 National Gallery of Victoria, Melbourne
 Queensland State Art Gallery
 Tandanya Aboriginal Arts Centre, Adelaide
 University of Wollongong

References 

1930 births
Indigenous Australian artists
Australian women artists
20th-century Australian artists
Living people
20th-century Australian women